Under the Hammer is a British comedy drama television series which originally aired on ITV in 1994. Written by John Mortimer, it is set at a London auction house.

Episodes
"The Fatal Attribution" (10 January 1994)
"Wonders in the Deep" (17 January 1994)
"The Virgin of Vitebsk" (24 January 1994)
"The Jolly Joker" (31 January 1994)
"After Titian" (7 February 1994)
"The Spectre at the Feast" (14 February 1994)
"Treasure Trove" (21 February 1994)

Main cast
 Richard Wilson as  Ben Glazier
 Jan Francis as Maggie Perowne
 Robert Lang as Lord Holloway
 Michael Siberry as  Nick Roper
 Marsha Fitzalan as Camilla Mounsey
 Stephen Boxer as  Keith Shrimsley
 Rose Keegan as Lucy Starr
 Susan Engel as Lady Holloway

Other actors who appeared in episodes of the series include John Gielgud, Ian Carmichael, Ursula Howells, Dan O'Herlihy, Hermione Norris, Thora Hird, Keith Barron, Judy Cornwell, Burt Kwouk, Alfred Burke, Phyllida Law, Lloyd McGuire, Philip Fox, Frederick Treves, James Cossins, Martin Clunes, Rosalie Crutchley, Emily Mortimer, Rosemary Harris, Michael J. Shannon and Susan Fleetwood.

References

External links
 

1994 British television series debuts
1994 British television series endings
1990s British comedy-drama television series
1990s British television miniseries
ITV television dramas
Television shows set in London
Auction television series
Works by John Mortimer
Television series by ITV Studios
Television shows produced by Meridian Broadcasting
English-language television shows